Blepharomastix epistenialis is a moth in the family Crambidae. It is found in Peru.

References

Moths described in 1939
Blepharomastix